Kasper Jensen (born 7 October 1982) is a Danish former professional footballer who played as a goalkeeper.

International career
Jensen is former youth international player and played for the U16, U17 and U19 in four matches.

References 

1982 births
Living people
Sportspeople from Aalborg
Danish men's footballers
Association football goalkeepers
Denmark youth international footballers
AaB Fodbold players
SønderjyskE Fodbold players
FC Carl Zeiss Jena players
SC Paderborn 07 players
SV Werder Bremen players
SV Werder Bremen II players
FC Midtjylland players
Djurgårdens IF Fotboll players
Vejle Boldklub Kolding players
Silkeborg IF players
2. Bundesliga players
3. Liga players
Danish Superliga players
Allsvenskan players
Danish expatriate men's footballers
Danish expatriate sportspeople in Germany
Expatriate footballers in Germany
Danish expatriate sportspeople in Sweden
Expatriate footballers in Sweden